Paul David Polly is an American paleontologist and the Robert R. Shrock Professor in the Department of Earth and Atmospheric Sciences at Indiana University as well as the sitting chair of the department.

Polly's research focuses on quantitative evolution, phylogeny, and paleoecology of vertebrates.  Much of his work has been on the phylogenetics and functional evolution of mammals, especially Carnivora and Creodonta, on the correspondence between phenotypic and genetic differentiation, on the role of functional traits in structuring mammalian communities, and on the evolution of multivariate quantitative morphological traits.  With lead author Jason Head and other co-authors, he helped describe the giant fossil snake Titanoboa and the associated methods for estimating paleotemperature from the size of extinct reptiles.

Polly received a BA from the Plan II Honors program at University of Texas at Austin in 1987 and a PhD in Paleontology from the Department of Integrative Biology at University of California, Berkeley in 1993 for his work on the phylogeny of creodonts. He was then a member of the Michigan Society of Fellows from 1994 to 1996, and on the faculty of the St. Bartholomew's and Royal London School of Medicine and Dentistry, and later the School of Biological Sciences, at Queen Mary, University of London from 1997 to 2006. He moved to Indiana University in 2006. In 2021 he became a Fellow of the American Association for the Advancement of Sciences (AAAS).

With Robert P. Guralnick and Allen Collins, Polly started one of the first 50 websites in the world in 1993, the University of California Museum of Paleontology site. In 2001, Polly received the Joseph T. Gregory Award from the Society of Vertebrate Paleontology for putting the society on the web and developing an online abstract submission system.

Polly served as president of the Society of Vertebrate Paleontology from 2016 through 2018. During Polly's term as SVP president, US President Donald J. Trump and Interior Secretary Ryan Zinke downsized two national monuments that protect vertebrate paleontological resources, Grand Staircase–Escalante and Bears Ears national monuments. Polly was involved in lawsuits by SVP to reverse those actions, which are currently ongoing.

References 

Living people
American paleontologists
American taxonomists
20th-century American zoologists
20th-century American geologists
1966 births
Paleozoologists
University of Texas at Austin College of Liberal Arts alumni
Indiana University faculty
University of California, Berkeley alumni
Academics of Barts and The London School of Medicine and Dentistry
American expatriate academics
American expatriates in the United Kingdom
University of Michigan fellows